"Hideaway" is a song by American house music group De'Lacy, featuring vocals by Rainie Lassiter. It is the group's most successful single and is written by Kevin Hedge and Josh Milan, and produced by Blaze. The Deep Dish remix peaked at number-one in Italy. It also reached number nine in the UK and number 38 on the Billboard Hot Dance Club Play chart in the US. The song has been remixed and re-released several times. A remixed version, called "Hideaway1998", which featured a mix by Nu‑Birth, peaked at number21 in 1998. The song was released a third time in 2006 and reached number 82 in the Netherlands.

In 2022, English disc jockey and BBC Radio 1 host Pete Tong teamed up with Eats Everything (aka Daniel Pearce) to deliver a spin on "Hideaway", giving it a stylish twist. It was featured on their album Pete’s Everything Club Rub which was made available via Ministry of Sound.

Background and release
"Hideaway" was originally released by Easy Street Records, one of the longest-established house labels in the US. It became one of the most talked about records at the 1995 Popkomm event and was picked up by Jim Ingles, A&R manager at Kickin subsidiary Slip'N'Slide Records. The production was handled by New York production team Blaze and remixes by electronic music duo Deep Dish, consisting of Ali "Dubfire" Shirazinia and Sharam Tayebi, were made. Slip'N'Slide felt these mixes were so good and so strong, that they decided to release "Hideaway" as a 12-inch doublepack, an unusual move by the label. However, to capitalise on the record's success, and to comply with singles chart restrictions, the track listing were reorganised so the track could be released as a 12-inch single and thus qualify for a chart placing. After it crossed over from the Club Chart Top 10 into the UK Singles Charts at number 9, other European and Asian territories were picking it up. Polydor Records in Benelux made it a priority record.

Slip'N'Slide label manager Max told in an interview with Music Week, "I met Deep Dish in New York and heard their work on Quench and I was raving about it. Coincidentally, Jim had heard a Deep Dish mix of Joi Cardwell's "Trouble" at somebody's house, and loved it. He said a Deep Dish mix would be perfect for De'Lacy and he sorted it out."

Chart performance
"Hideaway" was a major hit on the charts in Europe and remains the group's most successful song to date. It peaked at number-one in Italy in September 1996, with three weeks at the top spot. It reached the top 10 also in Scotland and the UK. In the latter, it peaked at number nine in its first week at the UK Singles Chart, on August 27, 1995. It spent two weeks at that position. But on the UK Dance Chart, it was a even bigger hit, peaking at number-one. Additionally, the single was a top 20 hit in Ireland, as well as on the Eurochart Hot 100, where it hit number 12. It was also a top 30 hit in Iceland and the Netherlands. Outside Europe, it was successful in Israel, peaking at number eight. In the US, it went to number 38 on the Billboard Hot Dance Club Play chart.

Critical reception
Larry Flick from Billboard declared the song as "flawless" and "uplifting". British electronic dance and clubbing magazine Mixmag deemed it "an orgasmic club moment." The magazine later stated that "its irresistible blend of floaty production and Rainie Lassiter’s soul-stirring vocal makes for an otherworldly, spiritual experience - with just the right amount of kick to ignite a club." Maria Jimenez from Music & Media wrote that De'Lacy "is set to take over Europe with the stompin' houser Hideway. Beguiling female vocals, deep bass sways, catchy percussion and anticipatory hesitance add up to a winner of a track." Music Weeks RM Dance Update described it as "a superb Blaze production with booming underground mixes from Deep Dish". Editor Tim Jeffery rated it five out of five, writing, "Licensed from Easy Street with a typically smooth and pleasant Blaze production, it would be easy to think this is just another quality US garage track, but the real action starts with the Deep Dish remixes. A thunderous kick and snare drum rhythm with warm organ chords and swooping synths complement the vocals perfectly and turn this into an epic, powerful and genuinely original piece of American house. Tough and extremely moving, this will be a huge club hit and it deserves to be a lot more." Another editor, James Hamilton noted the "mesmeric sombre unhurried chugging jiggly progressive long 121.8-122.2bpm Deep Dish Remix". Calvin Bush from Muzik stated that "hotter than tickets for Tyson's comeback (and about 6.23 times longer thanks to Deep Dish's extremely awesome mix), "Hideaway" has the rare ability to hold its own in both the underground and commercial market places."

Music video
A music video was made for the Deep Dish remix. It features singer Rainie Lassiter performing the song on several sites in New York City.

Impact and legacy
Music critic Tom Ewing said that "Hideaway" was probably his "favourite single of 1995."

Mixmag ranked it 2nd in their list of 'The Greatest Songs of 1995', whilst Face ranked it 21st. In 1996, Mixmag ranked the song at number 52 in their list of 'The 100 Best Dance Singles of All Time', and they also nominated the song for their 'Greatest Dance Track of All Time' title in 2012.

The Guardian featured the song on their 'A history of modern music: Dance' in 2011.

Tomorrowland included "Hideaway" in their official list of "The Ibiza 500" in 2020.

Accolades

(*) indicates the list is unordered.

Track listings

 12-inch single, US (1994)
 "Hideaway" (Klub Head's Hideout) — 5:45
 "Hideaway" (Klubhouse) — 5:15
 "Hideaway" (Klub Head's Dub-A-Way) — 4:24
 "Hideaway" (Klub Dub It) — 3:17
 "Hideaway" (Radio Edit) — 3:38

 12-inch single, UK (1995)
 "Hideaway" (Deep Dish Remix) — 11:51
 "Hideaway" (Dubfire Needs To Score) — 9:46
 "Hideaway" (K-Klass Klub Mix) — 9:08

 CD single, UK (1995)
 "Hideaway" (Deep Dish Radio Mix) — 3:29
 "Hideaway" (K Klass Radio Mix) — 3:22
 "Hideaway" (Deep Dish Mix) — 11:53
 "Hideaway" (K Klass Klub Mix) 9:08
 "Hideaway" (Dubfire Needs To Score) — 9:46

 CD maxi, Europe (1995)
 "Hideaway" (Deep Dish Radio Edit) — 3:27
 "Hideaway" (Deep Dish Remix) — 11:49
 "Hideaway" (Dubfire Needs To Score) — 9:45

Charts

Cover versions, samples and remixes
The group Sol Brothers sampled "Hideaway" in their song "That Elvis Track" in 1997.

British DJ and production duo Hoxton Whores covered "Hideaway" in 2003.

Barefoot covered "Hideaway" on the 2005 single "It's Like That/Hideaway".

David Morales collaborated with Blondewearingblack in 2018 to release a cover on his own DIRIDIM label.

British duo Tough Love featuring Reigns covered the song in 2018.

References

1994 debut singles
1994 songs
1998 singles
2006 singles
American electronic dance music songs
American house music songs
Deconstruction Records singles
Number-one singles in Italy